The Butlins Grand Masters was a former Major darts tournament organised by the British Darts Organisation and televised by ATV/Central  between 1977 and 1986. The event was sponsored by the holiday and leisure company Butlins.

Butlins Grand Masters finals

Tournament records
 Most wins 5:  Eric Bristow.
 Most Finals 6:  Eric Bristow.
 Most Semi Finals 7:  Eric Bristow.
 Most Quarter Finals 7:  Eric Bristow.
 Most Appearances 7:   Eric Bristow.
 Best winning average (99.27):  Jocky Wilson v's  Eric Bristow, Final, 1983.
 Youngest Winner age 24:   Eric Bristow. 
 Oldest Winner age 38:  Leighton Rees.

References

External links
Dartsdatabase: Butlins Grand Masters results
Mastercaller Butlins Grand Masters

1977 establishments in the United Kingdom
1986 disestablishments in the United Kingdom
British Darts Organisation tournaments
Darts tournaments
National championships in the United Kingdom
Darts in the United Kingdom